Boldrup Plantation Archeological Site is a historic archaeological site located at Newport News, Virginia. It was the location of a 17th-century plantation and now the site of a modern residential development. During the 17th century, Boldrup Plantation was owned by Gov. John Harvey (d. 1646), Gov. Samuel Stephens (1629-1669), and Gov. William Berkeley (1605-1677); the wife of the latter two men, Frances Culpeper Berkeley, lived there as well. The site includes the grave slab of Lt. Col. William Cole, colonial secretary of state, the graves of his second and third wives, and a pit house. The site was excavated in the 1980s.

It was listed on the National Register of Historic Places in 1982.

References

Plantations in Virginia
Archaeological sites on the National Register of Historic Places in Virginia
National Register of Historic Places in Newport News, Virginia